Thotta Chinungi is a 1995 Indian Tamil-language romantic drama film starring Karthik, Raghuvaran, Revathi, Devayani and Nagendra Prasad. The film was remade in Hindi as Hum Tumhare Hain Sanam (2002) by the same director. It was the Tamil debut film of Devayani.

Plot 
Gopal is in love with Bhuvana ever since they were children. As adults, they get married.

There are two things Gopal disapproves of, after their marriage:
Bhuvana's unemployed younger brother Prasad who lives with them, and Mano, Bhuvana's childhood friend.

Mano is quite handsome and a very famous singer and Bhuvana who is very fond of him, talks to him quite often on the phone.
The hardworking Gopal, who loves his wife dearly, wants complete attention from her, when he feels Bhuvana gives undue attention to her friend Mano, he grows gradually very suspicious and believes that Bhuvana and Mano are secretly seeing each other, resulting in throwing Bhuvana out of the house after his jealousy completely overwhelms him.

Bhuvana who equally loves her husband and never fully understood the turmoil he was going through, receives a note of divorce from him and is devastated. Prasad and Mano try to talk to Gopal, but Bhuvana forbids it. Finally, Mano arranges a meeting with Gopal, but the situation fails.

Mano is taken aback upon finding that his platonic relationship with his best friend Bhuvana has caused Gopal with such misconstruings. They argue and Gopal finally leaves. Mano talks to Bhuvana, she thinks it is entirely her fault: If she had understood that Gopal disapproved of her close relationship to Mano, she would have never seen Mano again.

Mano leaves her and promises to never see her again. He talks to his blind girlfriend Amlu about what happened and Amlu finally talks reason into Gopal. Gopal arrives the moment Bhuvana is giving birth, Gopal therefore realises his misapprehensions and the purity of Bhuvana's heart and they make up.

Cast 
 Karthik as Mano
 Raghuvaran as Gopal
 Revathi as Bhuvana
 Nagendra Prasad as Prasad
 M. N. Nambiar as Chandrashekar Gopal and Ramya Grandfather
 Devayani as Ramya
 Rohini as Amlu
 Senthil as Pinky
 Padmapriya as Lakshmi, Buvana's and Prasad's mother
 Praveen Gajendran as Young Gopal
 Vichithra as Monica

Production 
Thotta Chinungi is the first Tamil film for Devayani. It is also the debut for Priyan (then known as Nagendran) as the lead cinematographer.

Soundtrack 
Soundtrack was composed by Philip Jerry.
 "Maname Thotta Chinungi" – Hariharan
"Maname Thotta Chinungi" (female) – Chithra
 "Ramya Ramya" – Mano
 "Rajni Vara Bhavani" – SPB
 "Coke Pepsi" – Suresh Peters
 "Illanthendral Veesum" – Mano
 "Nammoda thalaivar ennalum" – SPB

Reception 
K. Vijiyan of New Straits Times said the film "proved easy to watch despite running two hours and 45 minutes". Kalki wrote the film flows like a river without the rush of a commercial film and like an art film without the speed of a turtle.

Remake 
Adhiyaman chose to direct his first Hindi film and began remaking Thotta Chinungi in Hindi as Aap Mere Hai Sanam in early 1998. The film languished in production hell and was eventually released in 2002 as Hum Tumhare Hain Sanam.

References

External links 
 

1990s Tamil-language films
1995 films
1995 romantic drama films
Films directed by K. S. Adhiyaman
Indian romantic drama films
Tamil films remade in other languages